Samsŏk-kuyŏk, or Samsŏk District is one of the 18 kuyŏk that constitute Pyongyang, North Korea.

Administrative divisions
Samsŏk-kuyŏk is divided into 4 tong (neighbourhoods) and 7 ri (villages):

 Changsuwŏn-dong 장수원동 (長水院洞)
 Mun'yŏng-dong 문영동 (文榮洞)
 Sŏngmun 1-dong 성문 1동 (聖文 1洞)
 Sŏngmun 2-dong 성문 2동 (聖文 2洞)
 Honam-ri 호남리 (湖南里)
 Kwangdŏng-ri 광덕리 (廣德里)
 Samsŏng-ri 삼석리 (三石里)
 Samsŏng-ri 삼성리 (三成里)
 Todŏng-ri 도덕리 (道德里)
 Wŏnhŭng-ri 원흥리 (円興里)
 Wŏnsil-li 원신리 (元新里)

References 

Districts of Pyongyang